Manon Humbert (born 11 April 1989) is a French female curler.

At the national level, she is a seven-time French women's champion curler (2009, 2010, 2011, 2013, 2014, 2015, 2016), 2016 French mixed doubles bronze medallist and two-time French junior champion curler (2007, 2008).

Teams

Women's

Mixed

Mixed doubles

References

External links

 Equipe Senior Dame 1 - Besançon Curling Club
 Manon HUMBERT (BESANCON) - Copains d'avant
 

Living people
1989 births
French female curlers
French curling champions